A sarpanch, gram pradhan, or mukhiya is a decision-maker, elected by the village-level constitutional body of local self-government called the gram sabha (village government) in India. The sarpanch, together with other elected panchayat members (referred to as ward panch), constitute gram panchayats and zilla panchayats. The sarpanch is the focal point of contact between government officers and the village community and retains power for five years.

Meaning of sarpanch 
Sar, meaning head, and panch, meaning five, gives the meaning head of the five decision-makers of the gram panchayat of the village. In the state of West Bengal, a sarpanch is called a panchayat pradhan ("chief"), and the deputy is panchyat upa-pradhan.

Roles and responsibilities 
A sarpanch performs a number of administrative duties.

Eligibility 
A sarpanch must be a citizen of at least 21 years of age, and have no legal convictions, among other requirements.

Tenure 

The tenure of sarpanch in India is five years.

Panchayati raj 
India's federal structure of governance means that different states have different laws governing the powers of the gram panchayats and sarpanches.

Panchayat elections 
In many states, elections were not held for decades and instead of elected sarpanches, the gram panchayats were run by bureaucratically appointed administrators. With the passage of 73rd and 74th constitutional amendments in 1992, a number of safeguards have been built in, including those pertaining to regular elections.

Reservation for women 
Article 243D(3) of the 73rd Constitutional Amendment requires one-third of seats in panchayats and one-third of panchayat chairperson positions be reserved for women, across all three levels of the panchayati raj system. This amendment followed various state-level legislative reforms in which reservations were set for panchayat positions to be held by women.

References 

Desi culture
Hindi words and phrases
Panchayati raj (India)
Punjabi words and phrases
Region-specific legal occupations